Martin P. Mullen (July 29, 1921 – February 26, 1996) was a Democratic member of the Pennsylvania House of Representatives.

Born to Irish immigrants John and Nellie Mullen he grew up in Philadelphia and attended the Wharton School at the University of Pennsylvania. His education was interrupted by World War II during which he served in the Army Air Corps in the Pacific Theater eventually rising to the rank of Sergeant. After the war he returned to Philadelphia and finished his degree at Wharton in 1948. He later attended Temple Law School and received his Juris Doctor in 1954. He served as in-house counsel for Wanamaker's department store until 1988.

He served in office from 1952 to 1982, when he left office after redistricting following the 1980 census. During his time in office he was one of the most vocal opponents of abortion, adultery and pornography. He unsuccessfully sponsored legislation that sought to outlaw all three. In 1974 he unsuccessfully ran for governor receiving only 19% of the vote.

References

Democratic Party members of the Pennsylvania House of Representatives
1921 births
1996 deaths
20th-century American politicians